A referendum on withdrawing from the League of Nations was held in Germany on 12 November 1933 alongside Reichstag elections. The measure was approved by 95.1% of voters with a turnout of 96.3%. It was the first of a series of referendums held by the German cabinet under Chancellor Adolf Hitler, after the cabinet conferred upon itself the ability to hold referendums on 14 July 1933.

The referendum question was on a separate ballot from the one used for the elections. The question was: "Do you approve, German man, and you, German woman, this policy of your national government, and are you willing to declare as the expression of your own opinion and your own will and solemnly profess it?"

Conduct
To whip up nationalist sentiment in the run up to the vote, the Nazi Party intentionally timed the referendum to take place as close as possible to the fifteenth anniversary of the Armistice of Compiègne, then a bitter memory in the minds of not only the Nazis but also most ordinary Germans. Since German elections always took place on Sundays, the vote was held one day after the anniversary.

Of the democratic nature of the referendum, the political scientist Arnold Zurcher writes that "there undoubtedly was a great deal" of "intangible official pressure" but "[probably very little] downright coercion and intimidation at the polls". The historian Heinrich August Winkler notes that "the rejection of the Versailles system was extraordinarily popular" and that at this stage in the history of Nazi Germany, it was still possible to vote negatively, to invalidate one's ballot or not to vote at all "without great personal risk". In particular, the Nazis made no effort to prevent the casting of negative or invalid votes in districts that were known to have large populations of Jews, Poles and other ethnic minorities, who were then still allowed to vote. The expected unfavourable results in such areas would be useful in propaganda as proof of disloyalty to the Reich.

Results
In East Prussia, the stronghold of the Junkers, support for withdrawal reached 97.3%, while in Hamburg, formerly a communist stronghold, only 83.9% voted in favour. This regional variation was repeated in the referendum of 1934. In general, rural parts of the country were more favourable and the cities least favourable to withdrawal, but overall support was higher than for granting Hitler presidential powers in 1934.

Voter turnout was greatest in the Pfalz region, where 98.4% of registered voters cast ballots. It was lowest in the affluent Berlin suburb of Potsdam at 90%.

References

1933 referendums
1933 elections in Germany
Referendums in Germany
November 1933 events
League of Nations